Doğanbey, named İpsili or İpsili Hisar (from , its Byzantine-era name) until the late Ottoman period, is a town in south western Turkey in the district of Seferihisar depending İzmir and near the ancient sites of Myonnesos and Lebedos (Lebedus in Latin) and believed to have derived from that settlement from the time when, in antiquity, most of its Greek population was deported to Ephesus.

Seferihisar
Towns in Turkey